Mount Rees is a  mountain which rises above the cliffs at the west side of Koettlitz Névé,  SSW of Mount Talmadge, Victoria Land. It is named after Margaret N. Rees, geologist, University of Nevada, Las Vegas, who conducted field studies in the Transantarctic Mountains, including the Skelton Glacier area of the Hillary Coast, through several seasons, 1984–96.

Mountains of the Ross Dependency
Hillary Coast